A seanchaí ( or  – plural) is a traditional Gaelic storyteller or historian. The word is often anglicised as shanachie.

The word , which was spelled  (plural ) before the Irish-language spelling reform of 1948, means a bearer of "old lore".

Traditional art
 were servants to the heads of the lineages and kept track of important information for them: laws, genealogies, annals, literature, etc. After the destruction of Gaelic civilization in the 1600s as a result of the English conquests, these more formal roles ceased to exist and the term  came to be associated instead with traditional storytellers from the lower classes.

The  made use of a range of storytelling conventions, styles of speech and gestures that were peculiar to the Irish folk tradition and characterized them as practitioners of their art.

In their storytelling, some displayed archaic Hiberno-English idioms and vocabulary distinct from the style of ordinary conversation.

Modern times

At events such as mummers' festival in New Inn, County Galway, and the All-Ireland Fleadh Ceoil storytellers who preserve the stories and oratory style of the  continue to display their art and compete for awards. Eddie Lenihan is one notable modern-day , based in County Clare.

Seán Ó hEinirí of Cill Ghallagáin, County Mayo was thought to be the last  and the last monolingual speaker of the Irish language.

Actor Eamon Kelly was well known for his portrayals of the traditional , and ran several series of one-man shows in Dublin's Abbey Theatre.

Other uses of the term
The term is also found within Scottish Gaelic and Manx where it is spelt  and  respectively. All uses ultimately have their roots in the traditional poets attached to the households of ancient Gaelic nobility.

The Shanachies are a cricket club playing in the Inner West Harbour grade competition in Sydney.

See also

 Gaelic Ireland
 Dubhaltach Mac Fhirbhisigh

Notes

References
 Padraig Colum, editor, A Treasury of Irish Folklore
 Frank DeLaney, Ireland
 Patricia A. Lynch, Joachim Fischer, and Brian Coates, Back to the Present: Forward to the Past—Irish Writing and History since 1798
Leabhar Seán Ó Conaill. Killrelig Co, Kerry

Note Seanachai of "Song Of The Sea" (2014) who is inspired by the tradition.

External links
 How To Tell A Story -The Seanachaí (Eamon Kelly)

Gaelic culture
Irish culture
Storytelling
Irish words and phrases
Irish poets
Irish storytellers